The tail is the section at the rear end of certain kinds of animals’ bodies; in general, the term refers to a distinct, flexible appendage to the torso. It is the part of the body that corresponds roughly to the sacrum and coccyx in mammals, reptiles, and birds. While tails are primarily a feature of vertebrates, some invertebrates including scorpions and springtails, as well as snails and slugs, have tail-like appendages that are sometimes referred to as tails. Tailed objects are sometimes referred to as "caudate" and the part of the body associated with or proximal to the tail are given the adjective "caudal".

Function

Animal tails are used in a variety of ways. They provide a source of locomotion for fish and some other forms of marine life. Many land animals use their tails to brush away flies and other biting insects. Most canines use their tails to communicate mood and intention. Some species, including cats and kangaroos, use their tails for balance; and some, such as monkeys and opossums, have what are known as prehensile tails, which are adapted to allow them to grasp tree branches.

Tails are also used for social signaling. Some deer species flash the white underside of their tails to warn other nearby deer of possible danger, beavers slap the water with their tails to indicate danger, and canids (including domestic dogs) indicate emotions through the positioning and movement of their tails. Some species' tails are armored, and some, such as those of scorpions, contain venom.

Some species of lizard can detach ("cast") their tails from their bodies.  This can help them to escape predators, which are either distracted by the wriggling, detached tail or left with only the tail while the lizard flees. Tails cast in this manner generally grow back over time, though the replacement is typically darker in colour than the original and contains only cartilage, not bone. Various species of rat demonstrate a similar function with their tails, known as degloving, in which the outer layer is shed in order for the animal to escape from a predator. 

Most birds' tails end in long feathers called rectrices. These feathers are used as a rudder, helping the bird steer and maneuver in flight; they also help the bird to balance while it is perched.  In some species—such as birds of paradise, lyrebirds, and most notably peafowl—modified tail feathers play an important role in courtship displays.  The extra-stiff tail feathers of other species, including woodpeckers and woodcreepers, allow them to brace themselves firmly against tree trunks.

The tails of grazing animals, such as horses, are used both to sweep away insects and positioned or moved in ways that indicate the animal's physical or emotional state.

Human tails
In humans, tail bud refers to the part of the embryo which develops into the end of the spine.
However, this is not a tail.
Infrequently, a child is born with a "soft tail", which contains no vertebrae, but only blood vessels, muscles, and nerves, but this is regarded as an abnormality rather than a vestigial true tail, even when such an appendage is located where the tail would be expected. Fewer than 40 cases have been reported of infants with "true tails" containing the caudal vertebrae, a result of atavism.

Humans have a "tail bone" (the coccyx) attached to the pelvis; it comprises fused vertebrae, usually four, at the bottom of the vertebral column. It does not normally protrude externally - humans are an acaudal (or acaudate) species (i.e., tailless).

Gallery

See also
 Empennage, the tail of an aircraft
 Rump (animal)

References

External links 
 

Animal anatomy